Robert Justus Kleberg (September 10, 1803October 30, 1888), christened Johan Christian Justus Robert Kleberg, was a German Texan from Herstelle, Westphalia, then part of the Kingdom of Prussia. He was a veteran of the Battle of San Jacinto and the brother of Louis Kleberg.  He arrived in Texas in 1836 with his wife Philippine Sophie Rosalie "Rosa" von Roeder, who was a child of the at one-time aristocratic von Roeder family, which was allied with the wealthy and aristocratic Sack family of Nordrhein Westphalia. Robert and Rosa had eleven children, seven of whom lived to adulthood; Clara, Johanna, Caroline, Rudolph, Marcellus, and Robert, Jr.
 
He is the namesake of Kleberg County, Texas.  His sons also achieved success.  Rudolph Kleberg (1847-1924) became a United States congressman, Marcellus Kleberg (1849-1913) studied law and served as city attorney for Galveston, Texas, and the youngest Kleberg son, Robert Justus Kleberg, Jr. (1853-1932) managed the King Ranch and later married Alice Gertrudis King, the youngest daughter of cattle baron, Captain Richard King.

Sources

John Henry Brown, Indian Wars and Pioneers of Texas, 1880

External links
 Kleberg, Robert Justus at Handbook of Texas Online
 KLEBERG, LOUIS at Handbook of Texas Online
 The First German Settlement in Texas at Handbook of Texas Online

1803 births
1888 deaths
People from the Province of Westphalia
People of the Texas Revolution
German emigrants to the United States
Kleberg family